Vaska's complex is the trivial name for the chemical compound trans-carbonylchlorobis(triphenylphosphine)iridium(I), which has the formula IrCl(CO)[P(C6H5)3]2. This square planar diamagnetic organometallic complex consists of a central iridium atom bound to two mutually trans triphenylphosphine ligands, carbon monoxide and  a chloride ion. The complex was first reported by J. W. DiLuzio and Lauri Vaska in 1961.
Vaska's complex can undergo oxidative addition and is notable for its ability to bind to O2 reversibly. It is a bright yellow crystalline solid.

Preparation
The synthesis involves heating virtually any iridium chloride salt with triphenylphosphine and a carbon monoxide source. The most popular method uses dimethylformamide (DMF) as a solvent, and sometimes aniline is added to accelerate the reaction. Another popular solvent is 2-methoxyethanol. The reaction is typically conducted under nitrogen. In the synthesis, triphenylphosphine serves as both a ligand and a reductant, and the carbonyl ligand is derived by decomposition of dimethylformamide, probably via a deinsertion of an intermediate Ir-C(O)H species. The following is a possible balanced equation for this complicated reaction.

IrCl3(H2O)3 + 3 P(C6H5)3 + HCON(CH3)2 + C6H5NH2 → IrCl(CO)[P(C6H5)3]2 + [(CH3)2NH2]Cl + OP(C6H5)3 + [C6H5NH3]Cl + 2 H2O

Typical sources of iridium used in this preparation are IrCl3·xH2O and H2IrCl6.

Reactions
Studies on Vaska's complex helped provide the conceptual framework for homogeneous catalysis.  Vaska's complex, with 16 valence electrons, is considered "coordinatively unsaturated" and can thus bind to one two-electron or two one-electron ligands to become electronically saturated with 18 valence electrons. The addition of two one-electron ligands is called oxidative addition. Upon oxidative addition, the oxidation state of the iridium increases from Ir(I) to Ir(III). The four-coordinated square planar arrangement in the starting complex converts to an octahedral, six-coordinate product. Vaska's complex undergoes oxidative addition with conventional oxidants such as halogens, strong acids such as HCl, and other molecules known to react as electrophiles, such as iodomethane (CH3I).

Vaska's complex binds O2 reversibly:
IrCl(CO)[P(C6H5)3]2 + O2 ⇌ IrCl(CO)[P(C6H5)3]2O2
The dioxygen ligand is bonded to Ir by both oxygen atoms, called side-on bonding. In myoglobin and hemoglobin, by contrast, O2 binds end-on, attaching to the metal via only one of the two oxygen atoms. The resulting dioxygen adduct reverts to the parent complex upon heating or purging the solution with an inert gas, signaled by a colour change from orange back to yellow.

Spectroscopy
Infrared spectroscopy can be used to analyse the products of oxidative addition to Vaska's complex because the reactions induce characteristic shifts of the stretching frequency of the coordinated carbon monoxide.
These shifts are dependent on the amount of π-back bonding allowed by the newly associated ligands. The CO stretching frequencies for Vaska's complex and oxidatively added ligands have been documented in the literature.
Vaska's complex: 1967 cm−1
Vaska's complex + O2: 2015 cm−1
Vaska's complex + MeI: 2047 cm−1
Vaska's complex + I2: 2067 cm−1

Oxidative addition to give Ir(III) products reduces the π-bonding from Ir to C, which causes the increase in the frequency of the carbonyl stretching band. The stretching frequency change depends upon the ligands that have been added, but the frequency is always greater than 2000 cm−1 for an Ir(III) complex.

History
The earliest mention of IrCl(CO)(PPh3)2 is by Vaska and DiLuzio. The closely related IrBr(CO)(PPh3)2 was described in 1959  by Maria Angoletta, who prepared the complex by the treating IrBr(CO)2(p-toluidine) with PPh3 in acetone solution. In 1957, Linda Vallerino had reported RhCl(CO)(PPh3)2.

References

Organoiridium compounds
Carbonyl complexes
Triphenylphosphine complexes
Chloro complexes
Substances discovered in the 1960s